Chauvin was a village in Grosse Pointe Township, Michigan in what is now the Hilger Avenue district of Detroit.  It had a post office from 1897 until 1908.  In 1908 it was annexed by Detroit.

Populated places established in 1897
Former populated places in Wayne County, Michigan
Former villages in Michigan